= Offroadfinnmark =

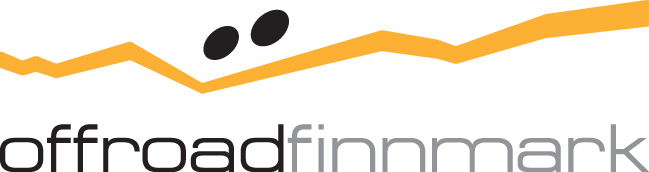

Offroad Finnmark is an annual offroad mountain bike race which takes place in Finnmark, Norway.
